Richard Miles (born 1969) is a British historian and archaeologist, best known for presenting two major historical documentary series: BBC2's Ancient Worlds (2010), which presented a comprehensive overview of classical history and the dawn of civilisation, and BBC Four's Archaeology: a Secret History (2013).

Miles was born in Pembury, Kent. He studied ancient history and archaeology at the University of Liverpool and sat for a PhD in classics under Professor Peter Garnsey at Jesus College, Cambridge. He is a professor of Roman history and archaeology and pro-vice-chancellor of enterprise and engagement at the University of Sydney. He was formerly head of the School of Philosophical and Historical Inquiry, and is a former director of the Arts Career Ready Programme at Sydney.  His research primarily concerns Punic and Late Roman history and archaeology.

He has directed archaeological digs in Carthage and Rome, and in 2010 he published Carthage Must Be Destroyed: The Rise and Fall of an Ancient Mediterranean Civilisation. He also hosted the two-part Channel 4 series Carthage: The Roman Holocaust (2004), which focuses upon the war between Carthage and Rome.

Works
 (editor) Constructing Identities in Late Antiquity (Routledge, 1999) 
 Carthage Must Be Destroyed (Allen Lane, 2010) ; Paperback (Penguin, 2011) 
 The Vandals (Wiley-Blackwell, 2010).  
 Ancient Worlds: The Search for the Origins of Western Civilization (Allen Lane, 2010) 
 (editor) The Donatist Schism: Controversy and Contexts (Liverpool University Press, 2016)

References

External links
Richard Miles faculty homepage

British archaeologists
British historians
Living people
British television presenters
Alumni of Jesus College, Cambridge
1969 births
Alumni of the University of Liverpool